James Sylvester may refer to:

James Austin Sylvester (1807–1882), Texas soldier who captured Antonio Lopez de Santa Anna 
James Joseph Sylvester (1814–1897), English mathematician

See also
A. J. Sylvester (Albert James Sylvester, 1889–1989), private secretary to British heads of state